Massilia niastensis is a Gram-negative, aerobic, motile, rod -shaped bacterium  from the genus Massilia and family  Oxalobacteraceae, which was isolated with Massilia niabensis from air samples from Suwon in Korea. Colonies of M. niastensis are ivory-coloured.

References

External links
Type strain of Massilia niastensis at BacDive -  the Bacterial Diversity Metadatabase

Burkholderiales
Bacteria described in 2009